Edward Dixon may refer to:

 Edward Dixon (politician) (1833–1905), Australian politician in Victoria
 Edward Weah Dixon (born 1976), Liberian footballer
 Ed Dixon (born 1948), American playwright and actor
 Eddie Dixon (1916–1993), American baseball player
 Ted Dixon (1884–?), English footballer

See also
Edward Dickson (disambiguation)